The album Journey of Life by German band X-Perience was released on 20 November 2000 in Germany. After the second album, Take Me Home (1998), X-Perience left their former record label WEA/Warner Music and signed at Polydor/Universal. The band start working on a new album right after touring and promotion the last album.

After a short break and releasing the promotional-only single "Journey of Life" back in 1999, the band released a second single in October 2000, "Island of Dreams", which was the main theme for the television show Expedition Robinson (German version of Survivor).

Not only the record label had changed, also the sound of the band expanded. The first two longplayers were dominated with synthies and electro sound, the third now has ethnosounds with Fiddle, Mandolin, Tin Whistle and other.

The album entered the German album charts at No. 41.

Track listing 
 "Island Of Dreams" – 3:09
 "Strong Enough" – 4:10
 "Journey Of Life" – 3:39
 "Am I Right" – 3:26
 "Come into My Life" – 3:45
 "I Want You" – 3:16
 "The Holy Mountain" – 4:33
 "The Meaning Of Life" (Duet with Joachim Witt) – 4:07
 "Back to the Roots" – 4:02
 "Say Good-Bye" – 4:14
 "Diggin' For Gold" – 3:39
 "Y2K01" – 3:24
 "Don't You Know" – 3:19

B-sides, rarities & outtakes 
B-sides
 "Because The Night" – released as b-side on single "Am I Right"

Rarities & outtakes
 "Lay Down Your Guns" – recorded 1999, later released as b-side on single "I Feel Like You"

There exists a plenty of demo and alternate versions of the album tracks. Many songs were re-written, re-written and/or re-produced during the three years of producing the album. The band worked with different teams of producers, so the styles and directions of the songs changed. Most of these demo tracks were released on x-perience.de as free downloads for a limited time. Such as
 "1999" Demo of "Y2K01"
 "Back to the Roots" Axel Breitung Mix
 "Come into My Life" Axel Breitung Mix
 "End Of This World" Demo of "The Meaning of Life", without Joachim Witt
 "Diggin' For Gold" Turbobeat Mix
 "Don't You Know" Axel Breitung Mix
 "I Want You (To Want Me)" Demo with alternate lyrics
 "I Want You (To Want Me)" Spanish Radio Edit
 "Say Good-Bye" Long Version

2000 albums
X-Perience albums